Following is a list of articles about notable sexual abuses perpetrated by groups, ordered by countries of occurrence:

Oceania

Pitcarin Islands
Pitcairn sexual assault trial of 2004

Australia 
Ashfield gang rapes
Catholic sexual abuse cases in Australia
Mount Rennie rape case
Sexual abuse scandal in Canberra and Goulburn archdiocese
Sydney gang rapes

Africa
Sexual violence in the Democratic Republic of the Congo

Europe
Casa Pia child sexual abuse scandal
Marc Dutroux
Marocchinate
Oulu child sexual exploitation scandal
Rape during the liberation of France
Rape during the liberation of Poland

Bosnia and Herzegovina
Foča massacres
Omarska camp
Rape during the Bosnian War
Sušica camp
Trnopolje camp
Uzamnica camp
Vilina Vlas

Germany
German camp brothels in World War II
German military brothels in World War II
New Year's Eve sexual assaults in Germany
Rape during the occupation of Germany

Republic of Ireland 
Sexual abuse in Limerick diocese
Sexual abuse in Raphoe diocese
Sexual abuse scandal in the Catholic archdiocese of Dublin
Sexual abuse scandal in the Catholic Diocese of Galway, Kilmacduagh and Kilfenora

Sweden
2017 Uppsala rape
We Are Sthlm sexual assaults

United Kingdom
Amberdale children's home
Aylesbury child sex abuse ring
Banbury child sex abuse ring
Beechwood children's home
Berkhamsted paedophile network
Birmingham bathing cult
Bristol child sex abuse ring
Caldicott School
Derby child sex abuse ring
Halifax child sex abuse ring
Huddersfield child sex abuse ring
Jersey child abuse investigation
Keighley child sex abuse ring
Kesgrave Hall School
Kidwelly sex cult
Kincora Boys' Home
Manchester child sex abuse ring
Medomsley Detention Centre
Newcastle sex abuse ring
North Wales child abuse scandal
Northern Ireland Historical Institutional Abuse Inquiry
Norwich sexual abuse ring
Operation Doublet
Operation Voicer
Oxford child sex abuse ring
Peterborough sex abuse case
Plymouth child abuse case
Rochdale child sex abuse ring
Rotherham child sexual exploitation scandal
Sexual abuse scandal in the English Benedictine Congregation
Telford child sexual exploitation scandal

Cases of sexual abuse within groups include:
BBC sexual abuse cases
United Kingdom football sexual abuse scandal

East Asia

China
Nanking Massacre

Japan
1995 Okinawa rape incident
Rape during the occupation of Japan

South Korea
Miryang gang rape
Nth Room Case

Vietnam
Lai Đại Hàn
My Lai Massacre

Central America
Catholic sexual abuse cases in Latin America
Sexual abuse scandal in Haiti

Middle East

Iraq
Abu Ghraib torture and prisoner abuse
Mahmudiyah rape and killings
Sexual violence in the Iraqi insurgency

Saudi Arabia
Qatif rape case

North America

Canada
Catholic sexual abuse cases in Canada
Residential school system
Sexual abuse in St. John's archdiocese

United States
2003 United States Air Force Academy sexual assault scandal
2010 gang rapes in Cleveland, Texas
Aberdeen scandal
Boy Scouts of America sex abuse cases
Martinsville Seven
Mormon abuse cases
NXIVM
Operation Stormy Nights
Puerto Rican Day Parade attacks
Seattle Mardi Gras riot
Sexual abuse scandal in Bridgeport diocese
Sexual abuse cases in Brooklyn's Haredi community
Sexual abuse scandal in Burlington diocese
Sexual abuse scandal in Hartford archdiocese
Sexual abuse scandal in Miami archdiocese
Sexual abuse scandal in Providence diocese
Sexual abuse scandal in the Catholic archdiocese of Boston
Sexual abuse scandal in the Catholic archdiocese of Los Angeles
Sexual abuse scandal in the Catholic diocese of Orange
Sexual abuse scandal in the Roman Catholic Archdiocese of Philadelphia
Sexual abuse cases in Southern Baptist churches
Sexual abuse scandal in Wilmington diocese
Steubenville High School rape case
Tailhook scandal
United States Air Force Basic Training scandal
USA Gymnastics sex abuse scandal
Sexual abuse cases in Southern Baptist churches

South Asia
Kasur child sexual abuse scandal
Rape during the Bangladesh Liberation War
Rape during the Kashmir conflict

India
1991 Kunan Poshpora incident
1992 Bhanwari Devi gang rape 
2012 Delhi gang rape
2012 Guwahati molestation case
2015 Kandhamal gang rape case
2020 Gargi College molestations
Shakti Mills gang rape

International
Child sexual abuse by UN peacekeepers
Comfort women
Commission to Inquire into Child Abuse
Jeffrey Epstein's sex-trafficking ring
Sexual abuse scandal in the Congregation of Christian Brothers
Sexual abuse scandal in the Salesian order

Groups
Abuses perpetrated by groups
Crime-related lists
 
 
Abuses perpetrated by groups